"Amazing Kiss" is BoA's second single in Japan. It was released July 25, 2001, and reached number 23 on the Oricon chart.

Track listing
 Amazing Kiss (4:36)
 Someday, Somewhere (4:07)
 Amazing Kiss ~English Version~ (4:36)
 Amazing Kiss (Instrumental) (4:36)
 Someday, Somewhere (Instrumental) (4:04)

Charts

BoA songs
2001 singles
2001 songs
Dance-pop songs
South Korean synth-pop songs
Torch songs